Čiflik is a small village in Demir Kapija Municipality, North Macedonia. It is along the Došnica river which springs from Mount Kožuf. The river is the source of drinking and power production for the municipality. It is also home to some indigenous fish and often the spot of fishermen off the beaten path, enjoying a quiet afternoon. It is located on a turn-off-road about 4 km down the Demir Kapija road Partizanska just past the bridge.

Demographics
According to the 2002 census, the village had a total of 90 inhabitants. Ethnic groups in the village include:

Macedonians 89
Others 1

References

Notes 
Demir Kapija: From Prehistory to Today , p 96

Villages in Demir Kapija Municipality
Hydroelectric power stations in North Macedonia